Louis Auriacombe (22 February 1917 – 3 December 1982) was a French conductor, active from 1956 to 1971.

Career 
Born in Pau, Auriacombe studied music at the Conservatoire de Toulouse where he won the prizes for violin (1931), singing and declamation (1937), harmony (1939). He then studied conducting with Igor Markevitch in Salzbourg from 1951 to 1956. He first appeared in public in Linz in 1956 and assisted Markevitch in Salzburg and Mexico City (1957), Compostela (1966), Madrid (1967) and Monte Carlo (1968).

The ensemble is specialized in Baroque music, but also performs contemporary music. He regularly performed with the Jeunesses musicales de France. In addition to his chamber orchestra, he conducted major orchestras, including that of the Théâtre du Capitole in Toulouse, the orchestre de Radio France and the Orchestre de la Société des Concerts du Conservatoire.

Following a stroke, he remained in a coma for eleven years until his death in 1982 at age 65.

Premieres 
 Maurice Ohana, Font aux cabres (1957)
 André Boucourechliev, Ombres, Hommage à Beethoven (1970)
 Ligeti, Ramifications (Washington, 1970).

Discography 
Auriacombe mainly recorded for the EMI/His Master's Voice/Pathé-Marconi labels, but also for Nonesuch and Véga. Some have received the Grand Prix du Disque award.

 Satie, Parade - (26 June 1967, EMI) 
 Vivaldi, Concertos, including The Four Seasons, Concertos for flute and mandolin etc. - Georges Armand, violin; Michel Debost, flute - Orchestre de chambre de Toulouse, dir. Louis Auriacombe (10-12 June/26-28 September 1967/9-11 April 1969, 5CD EMI 229234 2)  
 Ligeti, Ramifications (27-28 April/4 September 1970, EMI) 
 Guézec, Successif-simultané and Boucourechliev, Ombres - Orchestre de chambre de Toulouse, dir. Louis Auriacombe (27 April 1970/3 November 1971, EMI) 
 Mozart, Concerto for flute and harp, Kv.299 - Lily Laskine, harp; Michel Debost, flute; Orchestre de chambre de Toulouse, dir. Louis Auriacombe (EMI)
 Haendel, Concerto for harp, op. 4 n°6, Concerto for oboe, HWV 287 - Pierre Pierlot, oboe; Lily Laskine, harp; Orchestre de chambre de Toulouse, dir. Louis Auriacombe (July 1963, EMI 5653352) 
 Hindemith, Thème et variations : les quatre tempéraments pour orchestre à cordes et piano - Samson François, piano; Orchestre de chambre de Toulouse, dir. Louis Auriacombe (EMI)

References

Bibliography

External links 
 Discography on Discogs
 Louis Auriacombe on Encyclopédie Larousse
 
 Discography on AllMusic
 Vivaldi / Toulouse Chamber Orchestra, 1962: Concerto in G for Two Mandolins, P. 133 (YouTube)

1917 births
1982 deaths
People from Pau, Pyrénées-Atlantiques
French male conductors (music)
20th-century French conductors (music)
20th-century French male musicians